Katie Boulter (born 1 August 1996) is a British tennis player.

Boulter, from Woodhouse Eaves, Leicestershire, has won seven singles titles and four doubles titles on the ITF Women's Circuit. On 18 February 2019, she reached her best singles ranking of world No. 82. On 31 December 2018, she peaked at No. 431 in the WTA doubles rankings.

Boulter was ranked the No. 10 junior tennis player in the world in March 2014. She is based at the Lawn Tennis Association's National Tennis Centre in Roehampton and is coached by Jeremy Bates, Nigel Sears, and Mark Taylor.

Earliest and personal life
Boulter's mother played tennis at county level and represented Great Britain a few times. Boulter herself started playing tennis aged 5, and went on to represent Great Britain three years later, aged 8. She has said that when she was younger, beating her older brother was a motivating factor. "We used to practise together at this local court down the road from our house. It was the only thing I could eventually beat him in, so that felt great."

Boulter played the piano before her tennis career began to take precedence. She also has an interest in fashion and made an appearance in Vogue magazine in 2018. She is a supporter of Leicester City Football Club.
Boulter is currently in a relationship with Australian tennis player Alex de Minaur.

Career

2008–2013: Steady rise
Following in the path of Anna Kournikova, Boulter showed promise in 2008 when she won the Lemon Bowl in Rome, aged 11. She went on in 2011, aged 14, to become a finalist in the Junior Orange Bowl Tennis Championships in Coral Gables, Florida. Past finalists have included Andy Murray and Caroline Wozniacki. She was awarded the Aegon Junior Player Award that month.

Boulter claimed her first senior doubles title at a $10k event in Sharm El Sheikh in November 2013.

2014: Doubles success, first senior singles title
In January 2014, Boulter went on to have further doubles success and was a finalist at the Australian Open girls' doubles event with Ivana Jorović. In May 2014, in Sharm El Sheikh, Boulter won her first senior singles title over fellow Briton Eden Silva. She also won the doubles title at the same event partnering Nina Stojanović, to whom she had lost a previous final in singles. A month later, Boulter was given a wildcard for Wimbledon qualifying, losing in the first round to Italian Alberta Brianti in a three-set match which lasted two-and-a-half hours.

2018: First Grand Slam second round, top 100 debut

2018 became her most successful tennis year. She won her first $25k singles title at the event in Óbidos, Portugal in April. In May, Boulter then won a further singles title at the $60k event in Fukuoka, Japan. Despite falling in the first round of qualifying for the French Open, Boulter carried her good form into the grass-court season, She received a wildcard for the Nottingham Open and reached her first WTA quarterfinal there. In July 2018, she received a wildcard to the $100k grass-court event in Southsea, England where she fell to Kirsten Flipkens in the final.

She then received a wildcard into the Wimbledon main draw, where she won her first-round match over Veronica Cepede Royg. She lost to Naomi Osaka in the second round, in straight sets.

She ended the year ranked 100th.

2019: Australian Open second round

Boulter began the 2019 season in Hobart, Tasmania where she did not qualify, losing to Greet Minnen in three sets. Her next tournament was the Australian Open. She defeated Ekaterina Makarova, in three sets, with the first instance in the Australian Open of a third-set tiebreak, winning the tiebreak 10–6. However, her run ended in the second round with a straight-set defeat by Aryna Sabalenka.

Her next tournament was the St. Petersburg Ladies' Trophy during which she defeated Bernarda Pera, Katarina Zavatska and Ysaline Bonaventure in the qualifiers. She then lost to Ekaterina Alexandrova in three sets. At the Mexican Open, she defeated Conny Perrin, in straight sets, before retiring to fifth seed Sofia Kenin. At the Miami Open, entering as the sixth qualifying seed, she lost to Marie Bouzková in straight sets.

In April, Boulter suffered a spinal stress fracture while playing for Great Britain in the Fed Cup.

2020–2021: Another Wimbledon second round
At the 2020 Australian Open, she lost in the first round to Elina Svitolina.
At the 2021 Australian Open, she suffered a first-round loss against Daria Kasatkina.
At Wimbledon, she beat qualifier Danielle Lao before she lost to Aryna Sabalenka in three sets, in the second round.
At the 2021 US Open, she lost in the first round to Liudmila Samsonova.

2022: First top-10 wins
Having won an ITF tournament in February 2022, Boulter had to retire from the WTA event in Lyon in March due to a leg injury.

Boulter missed the clay-court season, but returned at the Nottingham Open in June where she came through qualifying to defeat Tatjana Maria in the first round before losing to Ajla Tomljanović. Granted a wildcard for the Birmingham Classic, she defeated Alison Riske (first top-40 win) and Caroline Garcia, before loing to Simona Halep.
At Eastbourne, she was also handed a wildcard and defeated fourth seed and world No. 7, Karolina Plíšková, for her first top-10 win. She lost her last 16 match against Petra Kvitová in three sets.

At Wimbledon, Boulter again upset Plíšková in three sets to advance to the third round of a major for the first time in her career. In round three, Boulter lost to Harmony Tan, in straight sets.

Performance timeline

Only main-draw results in WTA Tour, Grand Slam tournaments, Fed Cup/Billie Jean King Cup and Olympic Games are included in win–loss records.

SinglesCurrent after the 2023 ATX Open.DoublesCurrent through the 2022 US Open.''

ITF Circuit finals

Singles: 15 (7 titles, 8 runner–ups)

Doubles: 7 (4 titles, 3 runner–ups)

Junior Grand Slam finals

Girls' doubles: 1 (runner–up)

Head-to-head records

Top 10 wins

Notes

References

External links

 
 
 
 Katie Boulter at the Lawn Tennis Association

1996 births
Living people
People from the Borough of Charnwood
English female tennis players
People educated at Loughborough High School
British female tennis players
Tennis people from Leicestershire